Italy competed at the 1982 European Athletics Championships in Athens, Greece, from 6 to 12 September 1982.

Medalists

Top eight

Men

Women

See also
 Italy national athletics team

References

External links
 EAA official site 

 

Italy at the European Athletics Championships
Nations at the 1982 European Athletics Championships
1982 in Italian sport